Spiniphiline is a genus of marine gastropods belonging to subfamily Hermaniinae of the family Philinidae.

Species
 Spiniphiline caboverdensis Malaquias, Ohnheiser, Oskars & Willassen, 2016
 Spiniphiline kensleyi Gosliner, 1988
 Spiniphiline persei Caballer & Ortea, 2015
 Spiniphiline richardsoni Swinnen, 2021
 Spiniphiline verbinneni Swinnen, 2021

References

 Gosliner T.M. (1988) The Philinacea (Mollusca: Gastropoda: Opisthobranchia) of Aldabra Atoll, with descriptions of five new species and a new genus. Bulletin of the Biological Society of Washington 8: 79-100
 Ortea J. & Caballer M. 2015, 2016. The first species of Spiniphiline Gosliner, 1988 (Gastropoda: Cephalaspidea) in the Atlantic Ocean, with notes on its systematic position. Journal of Molluscan Studies 82(1): 122-128

External links
 Image of Spiniphiline caboverdensis

Philinidae